Jajui may refer to:
 Jajui-ye Olya
 Jajui-ye Sofla